Johannes Cornelis "Jan" Breman (born 24 July 1936, in Amsterdam) is a Dutch sociologist and an emeritus professor of the University of Amsterdam. He was awarded an Honorary Doctorate at Institute of Social Studies (ISS) on 29 October 2009. His inaugural lecture was entitled: The Great Transformation in a Globalized Perspective.

He is a Fellow of the International Institute for Asian Studies.

In 1988 Breman became a member of the Royal Netherlands Academy of Arts and Sciences. He was elected a member of Academia Europaea in 1989.

He has been known for the concept "footloose labour" in India. Footloose labour consists of those proletariats who are pushed out of agriculture labour market, hence depend on casual labour. They have to engage in multiple occupations to sustain themselves. Due to rural inequality they have to do seasonal migration to well off states such as Punjab and Haryana. This class of free wage labourers, especially after mid-1990s, are called "footloose labour".

Selected works
 Breman, Jan et al. (2019). The Social Question in the Twenty-First Century: A Global View. California: University of California Press. .
 Breman, Jan (2013). At work in the informal economy of India. A perspective from the bottom up. New Delhi, Oxford University Press.

References

External links
  ([24:39]) about India - Tariq Ali Discussing Jan Breman's book, talking about the poverty and migration in India.

1936 births
Living people
Dutch sociologists
Members of Academia Europaea
Members of the Royal Netherlands Academy of Arts and Sciences
University of Amsterdam alumni
Academic staff of the University of Amsterdam